Rabilu Musa (12 December 1971 – 9 December 2014), known as Dan Ibro, was a Nigerian professional Hausa comedian, Nollywood actor, filmmaker, and director.

Ibro attended Danlasan Primary School, located in Warawa and later moved to Government Teachers College Wudil all in his birth state. He joined the Nigerian Prison Service in 1991 and served in the civil service. Ibro quits civil service and later joined the movie industry with his first movie, Yar Mai Ganye, which promoted his career.

Filmography

Awards

References

1971 births
2014 deaths
Nigerian male film actors
Hausa-language mass media
Male actors in Hausa cinema
21st-century Nigerian male actors
People from Kano State
Hausa-language films
Kannywood actors
Nigerian male comedians
Nigerian film directors